The 55th General Assembly of Prince Edward Island was in session from June 29, 1979, to August 31, 1982. The Progressive Conservative Party led by Angus MacLean formed the government. When MacLean retired from politics in 1979, James Lee became premier and party leader.

Daniel Compton was elected speaker.

There were four sessions of the 55th General Assembly:

Members

Kings

Prince

Queens

Notes:

References
 Election results for the Prince Edward Island Legislative Assembly, 1979-04-23
 O'Handley, Kathryn Canadian Parliamentary Guide, 1994 

Terms of the General Assembly of Prince Edward Island
1979 establishments in Prince Edward Island
1982 disestablishments in Prince Edward Island